Pallavi Purohit is an Indian actress from Mumbai who has appeared in several TV shows since 2006, television commercials, Hindi, Malayalam and Kannada movies. Pallavi is best known for her key roles as Padmini in Madhubala – Ek Ishq Ek Junoon, Damini Verma in Malayalam movie Mr. Fraud opposite Mohanlal, Sangeetha in Malayalam movie Silence opposite Mammootty, Savita Pathare in Hindi movie Kaanchi opposite Mithun Chakraborty and, recently, as Smita in Kannada movie "Manasmita" opposite Atul Kulkarni.

Early life
Her father is from Palakkad but she was brought up in Karnataka. Pallavi completed her Business Management and Hotel Management and began working with Oberoi Hotel in Bengaluru. She decided to give up the job and become an actress.

Career
She has worked in several shows for Balaji Telefilms. She was selected for the role of Gayatri in the show Karam Apnaa Apnaa. Thereafter she played the role of Gunn on Kahaani Ghar Ghar Ki. She later replaced Arunima Sharma as one of the three female leads in the role of Rano in Zee TV's Kasamh Se. She played the role of Urvashi Sanghvi in Basera   and has worked on other shows including Peehar (as Dr. Sara), Bajega Band Baaja (as Dilpreet), Paap Punya Ka Lekha Jokha, Sanskar, Raja Ki Aayegi Baraat and the TV series Sujata. She worked on Bairi Piya playing the part of Chiggy Bahu and later appeared in Jyoti  in the role of Asha.

Pallavi played Rohini Patwardhan in Sapnon Se Bhare Naina and Padmini in Madhubala - Ek Ishq Ek Junoon. Pallavi quit the show after signing up for a lead role opposite Mammootty in V. K. Prakash directed Malayalam movie Silence. Simultaneously, she also worked in a Subhash Ghai directed movie Kaanchi.
Thereafter, in 2014, she acted as one of the three lead heroines opposite Mohanlal in B. Unnikrishnan directed movie Mr. Fraud. She played Goddess Lakshmi in the Kannada show HaraHara Mahadev which was a remake of 'Devon ke dev: Mahadev'. She played the lead actress as "Smita", a classical dancer, in the Kannada movie "Manasmita" opposite Atul Kulkarni.

Filmography

Film

Television

Awards and nominations

References

External links
 

Living people
Actresses from Palakkad
Year of birth missing (living people)
Actresses from Bangalore
Indian television actresses
Actresses in Hindi cinema
Actresses in Malayalam cinema
Actresses in Kannada cinema